Colonel Albion Earnest Andrews, OBE (16 June 1877 – 14 December 1928) was the 6th Commander of the Ceylon Defence Force. He was appointed on 9 February 1927 until 14 December 1928. He was succeeded by the acting G. B. Stevens.

Andrews was commissioned into the British Army as a second lieutenant in the Hampshire Regiment on 4 May 1898, and promoted to lieutenant on 22 October 1899. He served with the 1st battalion of the regiment, was for a time seconded, but was back as a regular lieutenant in his regiment in October 1902.

During the First World War, he served with the 11th Royal Sussex Regiment and the Royal Hampshire Regiment.

References

Commanders of the Ceylon Defence Force
1877 births
1928 deaths
Officers of the Order of the British Empire
Royal Sussex Regiment officers
Royal Hampshire Regiment officers
People from Wells, Somerset
Military personnel from Somerset